Basketball contests at the 1996 Olympic Games was the fourteenth appearance of the sport of basketball as an official Olympic medal event. It held from July 20, 1996 to August 4, 1996. Games took place in the Morehouse College Gymnasium and in the Georgia Dome.

Medalists

With the U.S. men's team winning the gold medal, Scottie Pippen would become the first person to win an NBA championship and Olympic gold medal in the same year twice, after having played for the Chicago Bulls in the NBA Finals.

Qualification
An NOC may enter up to one men's team with 12 players and up to one women's team with 12 players. The reigning world champions and the host country qualify automatically, as do the winners of the five continental championships, plus the runner-up and third place from the Americas, the runner-up from Asia and the second through fourth places from the Europe tournament. For the women's tournament, the extra teams consisted of the runner-up from the Americas, in addition to the second and third places from Asia and Europe.

Men

Women

Format
 Twelve teams are split into two preliminary round groups of six teams each.
 The top four teams from both groups qualify for the knockout stage. 
 Fifth and sixth places from each group form an additional bracket to decide 9th–12th places in the final ranking.
 In the quarterfinals, the matchups are as follows: A1 vs. B4, A2 vs. B3, A3 vs. B2 and A4 vs. B1.
 The four eliminated from the quarterfinals form an additional bracket to decide 5th–8th places in the final ranking.
 The winning teams from the quarterfinals meet in the semifinals as follows: A1/B4 vs. A3/B2 and A2/B3 vs. A4/B1.
 The winning teams from the semifinals contest the gold medal. The losing teams contest the bronze.

Tie-breaking criteria:
 Head to head results
 Goal average (not the goal difference) between the tied teams
 Goal average of the tied teams for all teams in its group

Men's tournament

Preliminary round
The four best teams from each group advanced to the quarterfinal round.

Group A

Group B

Knockout stage

Women's tournament

Preliminary round
The four best teams from each group advanced to the quarterfinal round.

Group A

Group B

Knockout stage

Final standings

References

1996 Olympic Games: Tournament for Men, FIBA Archive. Accessed June 25, 2011.
1996 Olympic Games: Tournament for Women, FIBA Archive. Accessed June 25, 2011.

 
1996
basketball
1996 in basketball
1996–97 in American basketball
International basketball competitions hosted by the United States
Basketball in Georgia (U.S. state)